Sorauren is a village near Pamplona, Spain.

Sorauren may also refer to:
 Battle of Sorauren, part of the Battle of the Pyrenees
 Sorauren Avenue Park, Toronto, Canada